Raven Kumar Krishnasamy is a Malaysian politician who has been the Member of Johor State Legislative Assembly for Tenggaroh since 2013. He has also been Youth Chief of the Malaysian Indian Congress since October 2021.

Election results

References 

Living people
Year of birth missing (living people)
21st-century Malaysian politicians
People from Johor
Malaysian Indian Congress politicians
Malaysian people of Indian descent
Malaysian politicians of Tamil descent
Members of the Johor State Legislative Assembly